Mircea "Gil" Mărdărescu (born 12 April 1952, in Săcele) is a retired Romanian-American football (soccer) player.

In 1975, he joined the New York Cosmos as a midfielder in the North American Soccer League, where he played alongside three-time World Cup winner Pelé. In the same year he moved on to the Rochester Lancers, where he was coached by Ted Dumitru.

In 1980, he signed with the New York United football team of the American Soccer League.

His father Virgil Mărdărescu coached the Morocco to the 1976 African Cup of Nations title.

He currently lives in California with his wife Stephanie. Gil and Stephanie have two children together, Natalie and Nathan.  Mardaresco has three grown children from a previous marriage.

References

External links
Mircea Mărdărescu at Labtof.ro

1952 births
Romanian footballers
Romanian expatriate footballers
FC Politehnica Iași (1945) players
Liga I players
Wydad AC players
New York Cosmos players
Rochester Lancers (1967–1980) players
New York United players
North American Soccer League (1968–1984) players
American Soccer League (1933–1983) players
Living people
Sportspeople from California
Association football midfielders
Expatriate soccer players in the United States
Romanian expatriate sportspeople in Morocco
Romanian expatriate sportspeople in the United States